Mucilaginibacter yixingensis is a Gram-negative, non-spore-forming, aerobic, rod-shaped and non-motile bacterium from the genus of Mucilaginibacter which has been isolated from vegetable soil in Yixing in China.

References

External links
Type strain of Mucilaginibacter yixingensis at BacDive -  the Bacterial Diversity Metadatabase

Sphingobacteriia
Bacteria described in 2016